Priekopa is a village and municipality in the Sobrance District in the Košice Region of east Slovakia. In historical records the village was first mentioned in 1418. The village lies at an altitude of 108 metres and covers an area of 12.269 km2. It has a population of about 300 people. The village has a soccer pitch.

External links 
 
 http://www.statistics.sk/mosmis/eng/run.html
 http://en.e-obce.sk/obec/priekopa/priekopa.html
 http://www.priekopa.yw.sk

Villages and municipalities in Sobrance District